Melicope makahae, the Makaha Valley melicope, is a species of plant in the family Rutaceae.

It is endemic to the Waianae Range on Oahu island, in Hawaii. It is found in mesic forests.

It is threatened by habitat loss from invasive plants as well as feral goats and pigs.

References

makahae
Endemic flora of Hawaii
Biota of Oahu
Waianae Range
Taxonomy articles created by Polbot